The enzyme sorbitol-6-phosphatase (EC 3.1.3.50) catalyzes the reaction

sorbitol 6-phosphate + H2O  sorbitol + phosphate

This enzyme belongs to the family of hydrolases, specifically those acting on phosphoric monoester bonds.  The systematic name of this enzyme class is sorbitol-6-phosphate phosphohydrolase. This enzyme is also called sorbitol-6-phosphate phosphatase.

References

 

EC 3.1.3
Enzymes of unknown structure